LDRP Institute of Technology and Research in Gandhinagar was established in 2006. It was established as an institute of technical education imparting undergraduate and postgraduate education. It offers BE, MBA and MCA programs and facilities.

The college undertakes Research & Development activities, offers testing, consultancy and other extension services including continuing education to the small industry, and places students through the Departmentement. It is affiliated with Kadi Sarva Vishwavidhyalay University

History 
LDRP Institute of Technology and Research is the academic arm of the philanthropic trust - Sarva Vidhyalaya Kelavani Mandal, which is engaged in the spread of education in North Gujarat. The institute was established in 2005 to give education and training of professionals for careers in Engineering and other allied subjects. The institute offers AICTE approved Engineering Programme with Mechanical, Electrical, Computer and Electronics and Communication Engineering branches. The institute has received approval for starting an additional MBA programme within the Engineering College from the academic year 2006-07.

The institute is housed on a campus.

Departments 
  Mechanical Engineering
  Computer Engineering
  Information Technology
  Electrical Engineering
  Electronics and Communication
  Civil Engineering
  Automobile Engineering

Computer Engineering 
The Computer Engineering Department of LDRP Institute of Technology and Research was established with the inception of the institute in 2005.

Training and Placement

Sources 

LDRP ITR Website

Education in Gandhinagar
Universities and colleges in Gujarat
Educational institutions established in 2005
2005 establishments in Gujarat